Wauchope is a hamlet in the Scottish Borders council area of Scotland, near Southdean.

Wauchope House was demolished in 1932.

See also
Wauchope Forest
List of places in the Scottish Borders
List of places in Scotland

External links
Forestry Commission: Wauchope and Hyndlee Forests
RCAHMS: Wauchope House
SCRAN: Wauchope Hall
Campaign for Borders Rail
GEOGRAPH image: Wauchope Forest
Borders Cam - photos
Wauchope Memorial
Streetmap of Wauchope Forest

Villages in the Scottish Borders